David J. Bodycombe (born 1973 in Darlington, County Durham) is an English puzzle author and games consultant. He is based in London, and his work is read by over 2 million people a day in the UK, and is syndicated to over 300 newspapers internationally. He devises puzzle for the Daily Mail, Daily Express, Metro and BBC Focus magazine.

Bodycombe consults on television game shows, including The Crystal Maze, The Krypton Factor, The Mole and Treasure Hunt. He was the question editor for the first 8 series of BBC Four's lateral thinking quiz Only Connect. On BBC Radio 4 he appeared on the quiz Puzzle Panel and devised the cryptic clues for X Marks the Spot. He has written and edited over forty books, including How to Devise a Game Show and The Riddles of the Sphinx – a history of modern puzzles.

In 2005 he started to devise sudoku puzzles, and was the first person to have sudokus published in several major territories, including India and Scandinavia. As well as the classic 9x9 puzzle, he pioneered a number of alternative designs. His games, puzzles and questions also appear in magazines, and on websites, advertising campaigns, board games and interactive television.

He edits UKGameshows.com, a wiki-based web site cataloguing UK television and radio game shows.

Main credits

Television series
The Crystal Maze (1991–1995) – games devisor
Sub Zero (1999) – games devisor
The Mole (2001) – games devisor, UK series 2
Treasure Hunt (2002–2003) – clue writer
Mind Games (2003–2004) – puzzle writer
Starfinder (2003–2004) – games devisor
Inside Clyde (2004) – games devisor
Codex (2006–2007) – games designer
Only Connect (2008–present) – question writer/editor
The Krypton Factor (2009) – games designer
Panic Attack (2009) – question writer
Fifteen to One (2017) – question writer
Armchair Detectives (2017) – plot producer
The Family Brain Games (2019) – games devisor

Streaming series
Game On (2016) – Game Producer
Lateral (2018) – Question Editor
The Game Garage (2019) – Producer
DISCONNECTED (2020) – Question Producer
Tom Scott Presents: Money (2020) - Game Producer

Radio series
Puzzle Panel (1998–2005) – panellist/contributor
X Marks the Spot (1998–2006) – clue writer

Books
The Mammoth Book of Brainstorming Puzzles (1996)
The Mammoth Puzzle Carnival (1997)
Lateral Puzzles (1998, reprinted in the US as Mind Benders: Adventures in Lateral Thinking)
Optical Illusions and Picture Puzzles (1998)
Codes and Ciphers (1999)
Reader's Digest Compendium of Puzzles and Brain Teasers (2000, consulting contributor)
How To Devise A Game Show (2003)
Number Crunchers (2004)
Visual Vexations (2004)
SU DOKU for alle (Denmark, 2005)
SU DOKU for alle 2 (Denmark, 2005)
SU DOKU Classic (Denmark, 2005)
SU DOKU Classic, English version (Denmark, 2005)
SU DOKU Classic 2 (Denmark, 2005)
Master SU DOKU (Denmark, 2005)
Sudoku Classic 2006 Calendar (2005)
Penguin 2006 Sudoku (2005)
Penguin Holiday Sudoku (2006)
Master SU DOKU 2 (Denmark, 2006)
SU DOKU Classic 3 (Denmark, 2006)
SU DOKU Classic 4 (Denmark, 2006)
SU DOKU for alle 3 (Denmark, 2006)
Penguin 2007 Sudoku (2006)
Hyper Su Doku (Denmark, 2006)
Sudoku Classic 2007 Calendar (2006)
The Riddles of the Sphinx (2007)
SU DOKU Classic 5 (Denmark, 2007)
SU DOKU for alle 4 (Denmark, 2007)
SU DOKU Classic 6 (Denmark, 2007)
Master SU DOKU 3 (Denmark, 2007)
SU DOKU Classic 7 (Denmark, 2007)
SU DOKU for alle 5 (Denmark, 2007)
Penguin 2008 Sudoku (2007)
SU DOKU Classic 8 (Denmark, 2007)
Sudoku Classic 2008 Calendar (2007)
Penguin Pocket Sudoku (2008)
Penguin 2009 Sudoku (2008)
Penguin Pocket Sudoku 2 (2008)
Penguin 2010 Sudoku (2009)
Penguin Pocket Sudoku 3 (2009)
Penguin Sudoku Challenge Vol. 1 (2010)

UKGameshows.com

Bodycombe co-founded and still runs the website UKGameshows.com.

References

External links
Labyrinth Games, David J. Bodycombe's official website
UK Gameshows website

Forlaget SuDoku, Danish publisher of David J. Bodycombe's sudoku

1973 births
Alumni of Trevelyan College, Durham
Living people
Puzzle designers
People from Darlington
People educated at Barnard Castle School